Lansdowne is a historic mansion that is listed on the National Register of Historic Places in Natchez, Adams County, Mississippi. It was originally built as the owner's residence on the 727-acre, antebellum, Lansdowne Plantation. The mansion and 120 acres are still owned and occupied by the descendants of the builder, who open it periodically for tours.

Location
Lansdowne is located on M.L. King, Jr. Road, one mile north of the Natchez city limits (The driveway into the plantation is now known as Marshall Road).

History

George Matthews Marshall, a Princeton University graduate, and his new bride Charlotte Hunt built the mansion on 727 acres previously known as the 'Ivy Tract' in 1852–1853, having been given the land by Charlotte's rich, planter, father David Hunt (1779-1861). The plantation was named after the couple's English friend, the Marquess of Lansdowne, probably because it made them feel like English landed gentry. Lansdowne adjoined Homewood Plantation, which belonged to Charlotte's sister Catherine.

Before the American Civil War of 1861–1865, Lansdowne Plantation's cash crop was cotton. The plantation was 727 acres in size. Not being one of David Hunt's biggest plantations, he gave Charlotte and George another plantation across the Mississippi River in Louisiana as well. Their Louisiana Plantation was Arcola in Tensas Parish near the Mississippi River town of Waterproof.

George Marshall had twenty-two enslaved Africans on Lansdowne; and his Louisiana plantation, valued at $119,000, had 104 enslaved Africans. In 1860 his Louisiana and Mississippi property was valued at $319,000.  This did not include much of his earned and inherited assets.  His father was Levin R. Marshall, a Natchez millionaire planter who owned 1,058 enslaved Africans just before the Civil War. Levin R. Marshall lived at the suburban Natchez estate known as Richmond. Portraits of Levin R. Marshall and George M. Marshall, painted by Louis Joseph Bahin, hang in the dining-room at Lansdowne.

George Marshall fought in the Civil War. He was wounded at the Battle of Shiloh, returned home, and paid someone else to fight on in his place. During the War on January 8, 1865, eleven Union soldiers broke into Lansdowne to rob the Marshalls. They did not get much because the butler, Robert, had hidden the Marshall's silver under the floor of the mansion. In frustration the soldiers took a few pieces of the Marshall's fine china and smashed it along the road as they left.

Without the enslaved African labor from before the war, the plantations gradually lost money using share croppers for the labor; and the Marshall's plantation empire went into a steady decline. In general, Charlotte (Hunt) Marshall and her siblings had to sell off Cincinnati, Ohio real estate investments inherited from their father David Hunt, and take out mortgages on their plantations to make up their losses for as many years as they could. At times the Marshall descendants only had the small income from the sale of butter and eggs from their farming operation to keep them going. Beginning in 1932, charging tourists for tours of the antebellum Natchez planters' homes during the annual Pilgrimage tours brought in much needed money to keep the homes livable. A cotton plantation scene from the movie Show Boat (1951 film) was filmed on Lansdowne Plantation. During the 1950s the Marshall descendants sold off the last of their cotton lands. Lansdowne has been added to the National Register of Historic Places since July 24, 1978. In 1995 Devereaux Nobles and her brother George Marshall IV - both great-grandchildren of George Marshal I - owned Lansdowne. The mansion and 120 acres still belong to the Marshall descendants.

Architecture

The mansion, built ca. 1853, was designed in the Georgian Revival architectural style. The exterior of the mansion is deceiving, given the scale of the rooms within. It has high ceilings, and a 65 foot long center hall. The great size of the hall gives it a more extravagant feel than is found in many of the larger Natchez mansions. When entering from the front door into the center hall,  on the left side of the center hall are the drawing room, dining room and butler's pantry. A stairwell in the butler's pantry leads to storage rooms in the basement and attic. The basement had wine and dairy cellars. The attic is finished off nicely with gaslight fixtures. On the right side of the center hall are three bedrooms. Due to the impending Civil War, the Marshalls finished the mansion quickly, leaving off the second floor. Because of this, the planned library became the middle bedroom instead.  Two dependency structures flank the rear courtyard behind the house. During antebellum times, the north dependency housed the kitchen and wash room on the first floor; and the enslaved cook, butler and children's nurse's quarters on the second floor. The south dependency housed the billiard room and office on the first floor, and the schoolroom and governess's room on the second floor.

The mansion is important because it contains most of its lavish original interiors and furnishings with many items having been imported from Europe. The front parlor contains one of the most complete and well preserved Rococo Revival style interiors in Mississippi from the mid-1800s. The home contains rare Zuber & Cie wallpaper, rosewood and mahogany furniture, and Egyptian marble mantelpieces. The rosewood parlor set and Zuber & Cie wallpaper were purchased by George Marshall I on a trip to France. Various cypress base boards are painted to resemble oak and marble. The bronze chandeliers were once powered by gas made in the plantation's gas works.

To keep the house livable, in the early 1900s a bathroom was added on the end of the rear porch adjoining a bedroom.  Electricity was added in the 1940s. In 1962 a kitchen was installed in the butler's pantry and a second bathroom was added to one corner of the middle bedroom.  This was done with as little damage to the original interiors as possible.

References

External links

 Lansdowne Plantation Facebook page
 You Tube history video showing Lansdowne interiors
 The map at the library of congress website shows George Marshall's Tensas Parish, Louisiana Plantation (Arcola). The plantation is in the area below (south) of the Mississippi River town of Waterproof - near the bottom center of the map. 
 Photo of a bedroom in one of the two rear dependency buildings behind Lansdowne mansion

Plantation houses in Mississippi
Houses in Natchez, Mississippi
Houses completed in 1853
Houses on the National Register of Historic Places in Mississippi
Antebellum architecture
Greek Revival houses in Mississippi
Georgian architecture in Mississippi
National Register of Historic Places in Natchez, Mississippi
Cotton plantations in Mississippi